Edward Littleton may refer to:

 Edward Littleton, 1st Baron Lyttelton (1589–1645), Chief Justice of North Wales
 Edward Littleton (colonial administrator) (died 1705), administrator of the English East India Company
 Sir Edward Littleton (died 1558) (c. 1489–1558), MP for Staffordshire in five parliaments, including the Reformation Parliament
 Sir Edward Littleton (died 1574), sheriff of Staffordshire, 1563
 Sir Edward Littleton (died 1610) (c. 1555–1610), participant in the Essex Rebellion, MP for Staffordshire, 1604
 Sir Edward Littleton (died 1629) (c. 1577–1629), MP for Staffordshire in the Happy Parliament, 1624
 Sir Edward Littleton, 1st Baronet (c. 1599–c. 1657), English Baronet, politician and combatant in the English Civil War
 Sir Edward Littleton, 2nd Baronet (c. 1632–1709), MP for Staffordshire in the Cavalier Parliament, 1661–79
 Sir Edward Littleton, 3rd Baronet (died 1742), High Sheriff of Staffordshire
 Sir Edward Littleton, 4th Baronet (1727–1812), MP for Staffordshire, 1784–1812
 Edward Littleton, 1st Baron Hatherton (1791–1863), British politician
 Edward Littleton, 2nd Baron Hatherton (1815–1888), British peer and Liberal Member of Parliament

See also
 Littleton baronets
 Baron Hatherton
 Baron Lyttelton